The Amrok River estuary Important Bird Area comprises the North Korean part of the Amrok, or Yalu, estuary, with an area of 7,000 ha, abutting the border with China on the north-eastern coast of the Yellow Sea.  The site has been identified by BirdLife International as an Important Bird Area (IBA) because it supports up to 20,000 waterbirds.  Birds for which the site is significant include swan geese, Baikal teal, black-faced spoonbills, white-naped cranes, red-crowned cranes and Far Eastern curlews.  Only 1000 ha of the site is protected in a nature reserve.

References

Important Bird Areas of North Korea
Rivers of North Korea
North Pyongan
Wetlands of North Korea